Alessandro Mazzara (born 5 May 2004 in Erice) is an Italian skateboarder. He has competed in men's park events at several World Skate Championships, finishing 34th in 2018 and 15th in 2019.

He competed in the men's park event at the 2021 Tokyo Olympics finishing 12th.

References 

Living people
2004 births
Italian skateboarders
Olympic skateboarders of Italy
Skateboarders at the 2020 Summer Olympics
People from Erice
Sportspeople from the Province of Trapani